German submarine U-245 was a Type VIIC U-boat of Nazi Germany's Kriegsmarine during World War II. The submarine was laid down on 18 November 1942 at the Friedrich Krupp Germaniawerft yard at Kiel as yard number 679, launched on 25 November 1943 and commissioned on 18 December under the command of Korvettenkapitän Friederich Schumann-Hindenberg.

In three patrols, she sank three ships of 17,087 GRT.

She surrendered to the Allies on 9 May 1945.

Design
German Type VIIC submarines were preceded by the shorter Type VIIB submarines. U-245 had a displacement of  when at the surface and  while submerged. She had two shafts and two  propellers.

U-245 was fitted with five  torpedo tubes (four fitted at the bow and one at the stern), fourteen torpedoes, one  SK C/35 naval gun, (220 rounds), one  Flak M42 and two twin  C/30 anti-aircraft guns. The boat had a crew complement of between forty-four and sixty.

Service history
After training with the 5th U-boat Flotilla at Kiel, U-245 was transferred to the 3rd flotilla for front-line service on 1 August 1944. She was reassigned to the 33rd flotilla on 1 October.

First patrol
The boat's first patrol was preceded by a short trip between Kiel and Horten Naval Base in Norway. Her first sortie began with her departure from Horten on 14 August 1944. She passed into the Atlantic Ocean via the gap between Iceland and the Faroe Islands. The boat was attacked by a Catalina flying boat on 30 September. No casualties or damage was sustained.

Second patrol

Third patrol

The boat surrendered at Bergen on 9 May 1945 and was transferred to Loch Ryan for scuttling in Operation Deadlight. She was scuttled on 7 December 1945.

Summary of raiding history

References

Bibliography

External links

World War II submarines of Germany
German Type VIIC submarines
U-boats commissioned in 1943
1943 ships
Ships built in Kiel
Operation Deadlight
U-boats sunk in 1945
Maritime incidents in December 1945